Vern Seward is an American technology writer whose articles tend to focus on products and issues related to Apple Inc. He currently authors several columns for The Mac Observer including the columns Just a Thought and Just a Peek.

American technology writers
Living people
Year of birth missing (living people)
Place of birth missing (living people)
21st-century American male writers